Francisco Mejía-Guinand (1964 Bogotá, Colombia) is a New York-based architect and visual artist .

Mejía-Guinand gained prominence in the 1990s as an artist who merged architecture with sculpture and painting.

Background 
Mejía-Guinand studied Architecture at the Faculty of Architecture and Design of the Pontifical Xavierian University, Bogotá. He received a Degree in Architecture in 1988.

Mejía-Guinand has taught in several Columbian Universities and has lectured at  Museo Nacional de Colombia and Biblioteca Virgilio Barco.

Francisco Mejía-Guinand lives and works in New York and Bogotá.

Career 
Mejía-Guinand has spent his career examining ideas of abstraction and expanding his spatial and temporal approach to sculpture. In his work,\ developed in New York, he focuses primarily on arrangements of tetrahedrons systems.  This highlight Mejía-Guinand's interest in balance and the contrast between positive and negative fractal space, and explores the mathematical notion of self-similarity and the idea of multidimensional geometry.

Mejía-Guinand is best known for his geometric sculptures based on mathematics, Russian Avant-garde, Sacred Geometry and Origami principles. His work incorporates bronze, aluminum, stainless steel, titanium, brass, cooper tubing and cast aluminum and precious metals.

Mejía-Guinand's large-scale densely layered abstract oil painting are built up through layers of oil paint on canvas, then overlaid with mark-making using charcoal. His painting style displays the influences of Willem de Kooning, and Joan Mitchell.

Exhibits 
Mejía-Guinand's drawings, collages, paintings, sculptures and architectural models  have been exhibited in numerous solo and group shows in Colombia, United States, Europe and Asia.

Mejía-Guinand's first solo museum exhibitions, "Francisco Mejía-Guinand the Order of an Inner World" was held in 2003 at the Art Museum of the Americas, Other Solo exhibitions include:
	"Francisco Mejía-Guinand, The Triumph of the painting" at The Embassy of Colombia at Washington D.C., March 25 April 24, 2015
	"Francisco Mejía-Guinand 's Geometrics Jewelry " at Latin American Art Gallery PROMO-ARTE, in Tokyo,

Mejía-Guinand's paintings are in the permanent collections of:

 Art Museum of Americas 
 El fons d'art contemporani del Consell de Mallorca  
 Es Baluard Museum, Palma de Mallorca, Spain
 MAMBo, Bogotá, Colombia.

References

1964 births
Living people
Colombian architects
Colombian painters
Colombian male painters
Colombian sculptors